"I Know You" is a single by American rapper Lil Skies featuring American rapper Yung Pinch. It was released on May 31, 2018 with an accompanying music video and was produced by Taz Taylor. It is Yung Pinch's first and only song to chart, peaking at number 78 on the Billboard Hot 100.

Background and composition
The song surfaced on the Internet and was teased for months before it was released. It finds Lil Skies and Yung Pinch singing about dealing with "groupies" since their newfound fame. Aron A. of HotNewHipHop described the production as "dark and heavy".

Music video
The official music video was directed by Nicholas Jandora. The videos features "plenty of eclectic work on the graphics as effects boost the spaceship allure of the Tesla in which Skies lets off a few lines".

Charts

Certifications

References

2018 singles
2018 songs
Lil Skies songs
Song recordings produced by Taz Taylor (record producer)
Songs written by Taz Taylor (record producer)
Songs written by Lil Skies